United Nations Peace Messenger Cities are cities around the world that have volunteered for an initiative sponsored by the United Nations to promote peace and understanding between nations.

The movement began in the International Year of Peace, 1986 and lasted until 1991, during that period 74 cities were chosen from among thousands and appointed as Messengers of Peace by the UN Secretary-General Javier Perez DeCuellar. Representatives of 63 cities met on 7 and 8 September 1988 in

Verdun, France to participate:
 
"in the building of a world less violent and more humane, a world of tolerance and of mutual respect to enable the requirements of peace based on justice and human rights to be better understood".

The International Association of Peace Messenger Cities was established in 1988 and now administers the programme according to the statute of the Association and criteria for membership. The International Association of Peace Messenger Cities was established to recognize and encourage the role and responsibility cities have in creating a culture of peace. The IAPMC had its first meeting in Verdun France in 1988. It was formalized at a General Assembly meeting in New Haven, Connecticut, USA in 1990. Our first Statute was adopted in Marrakech, Morocco in 1991. The organization was born out of United Nations General Assembly designation as Peace Messengers based on idea that municipal authorities have profound responsibility to assume an active, creative role in establishing a Culture of Peace within their borders. Member cities of the Association meet twice a year with the aim of exchanging programmes, ideas and experience in cities around the globe. Their website, http://www.iapmc.org, is active after the General Assembly which was held in Slovenj Gradec, Slovenia. The IAPMC has been extensively involved in numerous peace campaigns, banning of anti-personnel landmines campaign, nuclear non-proliferation, human rights, and has attracted substantial public awareness in peacemaking efforts of the United Nations Organization, Economic and Social Council, Department of Public Information and other bodies. The participation at the international conferences throughout the years of IAPMC activities has been notable at prominent events such as World Social Forum, First World Conference on City Diplomacy (The Hague, 2008) etc. It has been one of the sponsors and co-organizers of Haifa International Conference for a WMD-Free Middle East in 2013. The organization is also a member of Abolition 2000 and cooperates well with similar organizations, such as Mayors for Peace.

Representatives 
President: VICTOR HADJIAVRAAM, Mayor of Morphou (Cyprus)

Vice Presidents: ANDRZEJ PIETRASIK, Mayor of Plonsk (Poland), VINCENT N'CHO, Vice-Governor of Abidjan District (Ivory Coast)

Secretary-General: ANDREJ ČAS, Mayor of Slovenj Gradec (Slovenia)

Deputy Secretary-General: DUŠAN STOJANOVIČ, Slovenj Gradec (Slovenia)

UN Representative: SYLVESTER E. ROWE (New York)

Honorary Members 
ALFRED L. MARDER, Honorary President, New Haven (US)

ANDRE HEDIGER, Geneva (Switzerland)

BRIAN FITCH, Brighton & Hove (UK)

SYLVESTER E. ROWE, New York (US)

Executive Board 
The following member cities are members of the Executive Board of IAPMC:
 Abidjan (Ivory Coast)
 Kragujevac (Serbia)
 Kumanovo (FYR Macedonia)
 Morphou (Cyprus)
 Orestiada (Greece)
 Płońsk (Poland)
 Sarajevo (Bosnia & Herzegovina)
 Slovenj Gradec (Slovenia)
 Volgograd (Russia)
 Zurrieq (Malta)

General Assemblies 
 1988 - Verdun, France
 1989 - Warsaw, Poland
 1990 - New Haven, Usa
 1991 - Yokohama, Japan
 1992 - Marrakesh, Morocco
 1993 - Geneva, Switzerland
 1994 - Arnhem, The Netherlands
 1995 - Lisbon, Portugal
 1996 - Bologna, Italy
 1997 - Abidjan, Ivory Coast
 1998 - Pori, Finland
 1999 - Kruševac, Serbia
 2000 - Oswiecim, Poland
 2001 - Yokohama, Japan
 2004 - New Haven, Usa
 2005 - Slovenj Gradec, Slovenia
 2006 - Vancouver, Canada
 2007 - Kruševac, Serbia
 2008 - Sochi, Russian Federation
 2009 - Sarajevo, Bosnia And Herzegovina
 2010 - Limassol (Morphou), Cyprus
 2011 - Kragujevac, Serbia
 2012 - Slovenj Gradec, Slovenia
 2013 - Missolonghi, Greece
 2014 - Kalavryta, Greece
 2015 - Kumanovo, FYR Macedonia
 2016 - Wielun, Poland
 2017 - Orestiada, Greece

Member cities
New member cities can apply for membership, providing they fulfil and comply with the membership criteria, either by contacting the officials (president or secretary-general) or any of the member cities which can propose the new member city at the General Assembly.

As of 2017, the 112 Peace Messenger Cities are:

Joined in 1987
Abidjan
Arnhem
Assisi
Atlanta
Bangui
Beijing
Brighton & Hove
Buenos Aires
Chicago
Como
Concord
Dakar
Delphi
Dhaka
Florence
Geneva
Hammam-Lif
Helsinki
Hiroshima
Kyiv
Copenhagen
Kragujevac
L'Hospitalet de Llobregat
La Paz
La Plaine sur Mer (a suburb of Nantes)
Lima
Lomé
Madrid
Maputo
Marrakech
Marzabotto
Melbourne
Minsk
Moscow
Nagasaki
New Delhi
New Haven
Pori
Prague
Ravenna
Rijswijk
Rome
San Francisco
San José, Costa Rica
Saint Petersburg
Sheffield
Sochi
Split
Stockholm
Tbilisi
Toronto
Vancouver
Verdun
Villa el Salvador
Volgograd
Warsaw
Vienna
Wollongong
Yokohama

Joined in 1988
Košice
Liège
Lisbon
Wrocław

Joined in 1989
Antwerp
Bogotá
Tashkent
Slovenj Gradec

Joined in 1990
Berlin
Kruševac

Joined in 1991
Bandung
Coventry
Quito
Tokyo
Vladivostok

Joined in 1997
Cambridge, Massachusetts

Joined in 1998
Oświęcim
Płońsk
Lublin

Joined in 1999
Morphou
Libreville

Joined in 2000
Suwon

Joined in 2001
Havana

Joined in 2004
Milton Keynes

Joined in 2005
Sarajevo
Milan

Joined in 2006
Freetown
Jeju

Joined in 2007
Puebla

Joined in 2008
Paju
Kotor
Kyrenia
Wieluń

Joined in 2009
Barcelona
Caracas
Friedrichshafen
Kumanovo
Mexico City
Yamoussoukro
Ypati
Zagreb

Joined in 2010 
 Kantanos

Joined in 2011 
 Messolonghi
 Poltava
 Torun

Joined in 2012 
 Berane

Joined in 2014 
 Kalavrita
 Ljubljana
 Orestiada
 Sparta
 Zurrieq

Joined in 2015 
 Strumica

Joined in 2017 
 Rostock

External links
 International Association of Peace Messenger Cities

Peace organizations
Peace Messenger Cities